Too Good to Stop Now is a studio album by American country music singer and songwriter Mickey Gilley released in 1984 by Epic Records. The album peaked at #34 in the US country chart. The title track, “Too Good to Stop Now”, reached #4 in the US country chart and #1 in the Canadian country chart. Another single from the album, “I’m the One Mama Warned You About” reached #10 in the country charts of both countries.

Track listing

Side one
"Too Good to Stop Now” (Bob McDill, Rory Michael Bourke) – 3:25
"Make It Like the First Time" (J. C. Cunningham) – 3:51
"Shoulder to Cry On” (Donald R. Miller, Ron Birmann) – 3:41
"When She Runs Out of Fools" (Steve Pippin, George Steven Jobe) – 3:46
"Right Side of the Wrong Bed" (Fred Knipe, Stephen Chandler, Duncan Stitt) – 2:31

Side two
"Everything I Own" (David Gates) – 3:17
"Reminders" (Kent Robbins, John Jarrard) – 3:54
"You Can Lie to Me Tonight" (Tom Campbell, Kerry Chater) – 3:03
"I'm the One Mama Warned You About" (Mickey James, Gail Lynn Zeiler) – 2:50
"Quittin’ Time" (Ron Hellard, Michael Garvin, Bucky Jones)  – 3:27

Personnel

Mickey Gilley - lead vocals, grand piano
Jay Winding: keyboards
Andrew Gold, Josh Leo, Brent Rowan, Rocky Stone - guitar
Bob Glaub - bass
Michael Botts - drums
Buddy Emmons - pedal steel
Ron Levine - fiddle
Beverly Randall, Ann-Marie Cianciola - backing vocals
Norman Carlson - saxophone

Production
Recorded at: Gilley's Recording Studio, Pasadena, Texas, Woodland Sound Studios, Nashville, Tennessee and Record Plant, Los Angeles, California.
Engineer: Paul Grupp
Assistant Engineers: Bert Frilot, Ken Criblez, Bill Hutchinson
Mixed on the Sony Digital System
Manager: Cliff Willdeboer
Management: Sherwood Cryer, Sandy & David Brokaw
Album front cover photo: Al Rogers
Album back cover photo: Norman Seeff

References

1984 albums
Mickey Gilley albums
Epic Records albums
Albums produced by John Boylan (record producer)